This is a list of Australian television events and premieres which occurred in 2009. The year 2009 is the 54th year of continuous operation of television in Australia. It also marks the introduction of digital multichannels for the three commercial television networks (the Seven Network, the Nine Network and Network Ten), which were each able to launch an alternate standard-definition digital channel, separate from their primary channels, from 1 January. Network Ten launched their channel, One (later known today as 10 Bold), on 26 March, whilst the Nine Network launched kids and movies channel GO! (later known today as 9Go!) on 9 August, and the Seven Network launched catch-up channel 7Two on 1 November.

Events 

 10 January – Peter Overton replaces Mark Ferguson as the anchor of Nine's 6:00 pm news bulletin in Sydney.
 31 January – After being pulled by the Nine Network in 2008, McLeod's Daughters airs its final episode to a total viewership of 576,000.
 7–14 February – All three commercial networks in Australia take major expensive news coverage of the 2009 Victorian Bushfires, in which 181 people lost their lives, including former Nine newsreader Brian Naylor and actor Reg Evans.
 9 February – The premiere of Underbelly: A Tale of Two Cities sets the ratings record of the highest-rating Australian television series launch since the introduction of the OzTAM people meter system in 2001. The launch attracted 2.58 million viewers, and is also the highest rating non-sporting program in television history.
 26 March – One HD launches.
 20 April – After a mini-term absence, Who Wants to Be a Millionaire? returns to Nine with the newly launched title Hot Seat which launches in its 5.30pm. A few years later, Hot Seat overtook Deal or No Deal's lead-in the 5:30pm quiz-show battle in the lead-in to the 6pm news with Nine News regaining the lead nationally.
 22 April – 15-year-old opera singer Mark Vincent wins the third season of Australia's Got Talent.
 26 April – Talia Fowler wins the second season of So You Think You Can Dance Australia.
 3 May – Rebecca Gibney wins the Gold Logie Award for the Most Popular Personality on Australian Television at the 2009 Logie Awards.
 10 May – After protest in very bad ratings, Australian Idol decides to cancel its Monday Night Live Verdict show. The show becomes a Sunday night staple. Later in the year the show has landed up a whole year of poor ratings. The year ended when 19-year-old Stan Walker taking the title as the final series winner with Sony Music Australia defeating Hayley Warner. Idol was axed in January the following year.
 12 May – The ABC receives an extra $136.4 million over three years from the 2009 federal budget to develop an advertising-free digital children's channel (ABC3), and increase its production of local drama to 90 hours a year, a similar level to the amount required by the commercial networks. The budget also allocated SBS an extra $20 million over the same period to produce up tp 50 hours of new Australian content each year. This figure is significantly below the extra $70 million SBS were seeking per year.
 13 May – Former rugby league footballer and The NRL Footy Show presenter, Matthew Johns, is suspended indefinitely from the program by the Nine Network following reports of his involvement in a group sex act with other Cronulla-Sutherland Sharks players in 2002. The incident was first reported on ABC1's current affairs program, Four Corners, on 11 May 2009.
 18 May – It is revealed that Ajay Rochester will no longer be host of Channel Ten's The Biggest Loser, a position she has held since the series began in 2006, due to her desire to pursue new interests. Alison Braun, the runner-up of the show's third season, is believed to be one of the front-runners to be the new host.
 3 June – A skit involving terminally ill children and the fictional 'Make a Realistic Wish Foundation' (a parody of the Make-a-Wish Foundation) causes public outrage after airing on an episode of The Chaser's War on Everything on ABC1. The skit involved The Chaser members Chris Taylor (as the foundation spokesperson) and Andrew Hansen (as a doctor). The premise of the skit was that if the terminally ill children are only going to live for a few more months before dying, it is not worth spending money on lavish gifts for them. It portrayed the children asking for extravagant items such as a trip to Disneyland and the chance to meet Zac Efron, with Taylor and Hansen instead giving them a pencil case and a stick respectively. The skit concluded with Taylor stating "Why go to any trouble, when they're only gonna die anyway". Following public criticism of the skit, both The Chaser and the Australian Broadcasting Corporation issued statements of apology. The ABC subsequently suspended the series for two weeks following the controversy. The series will return on 24 June.
 8 June – Gordon Ramsay called Tracy Grimshaw 'a pig' in an interview for A Current Affair. Also on 8 June, Barry Soraghan becomes the first person to miss the final question on Millionaire Hot Seat.
 10 June – The Nine Network announces the third series of Underbelly will be titled Underbelly: The Golden Mile, and would focus on Kings Cross in Sydney, beginning in 1989, and also include the Wood Royal Commission into police corruption.
 20 June – After getting into big trouble about scrapping the rights to Warner Bros., the Nine Network's proposed new channel becomes a light-entertainment channel for younger people, dropping Light Entertainment, Retro, Variety and Lifestyle from taking part (didn't use until GEM launched the following year). GO! was officially launched 9 August to become "Australia No. 1 digital channel".
 26 June – Nine News takes major expensive coverage about the deaths of Michael Jackson and Farrah Fawcett. Also, The final edition of Extra presented by Heather Foord goes to air in Brisbane and Bruce Paige presents his final weeknight bulletin on Nine News Queensland; he is replaced the following Monday by Andrew Lofthouse, who along with Melissa Downes remain in their roles as of today.
 19 July – A 38-year-old mother of three, Julie Goodwin wins the first series of MasterChef Australia, beating 35-year-old artist Poh Ling Yeow, with the Grand Final recorded the ratings over 3 million people tuning in.
 6 September – Country singer Adam Brand and his partner Jade Hatcher win the ninth season of Dancing with the Stars.
 25 September – Mark Ferguson presents his final bulletin on the Nine Network before moving to the rival Seven Network, where he remains as of today.
 28 September – Jeff Tarr becomes the second person to miss the final question on Millionaire Hot Seat.
 30 September – 2.64 million people tuned into the first Hey Hey It's Saturday reunion special to see the return of Daryl Somers and the gang.
 7 October – A "Red Faces" segment in the second of two Hey Hey It's Saturday reunion specials causes international catastrophe when the performers for Act 2 appear in blackface performing a tribute to the music of Michael Jackson. Guest judge Harry Connick, Jr. scores a O for the act while criticizes the segment as offensive and did not like the music of Michael Jackson. Hours later, Somers apologizes to him on air to say "sorry". During the replay of GO! broadcasts, when Act 1 finished, the show went to a commercial break and came back for Act 3, after Connick's 2nd performance from a number, it went to a final commercial break in time for the grand finale. Hours after the reunion show, Connick Jr. was fired and banned for life.
 21 October – A giant seagull appears behind Nine News Melbourne newsreader Peter Hitchener during the 6:00 pm news.
 25 October – Australian television legend Don Lane dies of long battle with illness, he was 75.
 27 October – After 12 years on air, the multi-awarding winning medical drama All Saints aired its last episode to a total viewership of 1,512,000.
 1 November – 7TWO launches, after failing to soft launch two days earlier.
 22 November – Stan Walker wins the seventh and final season of Australian Idol.
 25 November – Eamon Sullivan wins Celebrity MasterChef Australia.
 26 November – Empire of the Sun wins Single and Album of the Year at the 2009 ARIA Awards.
 27 November – Former Today and Seven News presenter Ian Ross retires after over half a century on air.
 30 November – Nine News relaunches its graphics after its worst ratings year on record.
 3 December – ABC3 launches.
 4 December – Federal Communications Minister Senator Stephen Conroy announces that Community television stations will receive $2.6 million in federal funding and the suitable spectrum to enable to begin digital simulcasts.

Notable celebrity deaths

Channels

New channels 

 20 January – A-PAC
 26 March – One
 1 June – SBS Two
 2 July – One (Southern Cross Ten)
 9 August – Go!
 1 November – 7TWO
 15 November – 13th Street
 15 November – Lifestyle YOU
 15 November – Discovery Turbo MAX
 15 November – Style Network
 15 November – NAT GEO WILD
 15 November – Family Movie Channel
 15 November – KidsCo

 15 November – Showtime Drama (replacing Showtime Greats)
 15 November – Showtime Comedy (replacing Showtime Greats)
 15 November – Showtime Action (replacing Showtime Greats)
 15 November – STARPICS 1
 15 November – 111 Hits+2
 15 November – Discovery Channel+2
 15 November – Lifestyle YOU+2
 15 November – Discovery Turbo MAX+2
 15 November – Sci Fi+2
 15 November – STARPICS 2
 15 November – Showcase 2
 15 November – LifeStyle Food+2
 15 November – UKTV HD (replacing BBC HD)

 15 November – FOX8 HD
 15 November – W HD
 15 November – Showtime Premiere HD
 15 November – Showcase HD
 15 November – Showtime Action HD
 15 November – STARPICS 1 HD
 15 November – STARPICS 2 HD
 15 November – Fox Sports 1 HD (replacing Fox Sports HD)
 15 November – Fox Sports 2 HD (replacing Fox Sports HD)
 15 November – Fox Sports 3 HD (replacing Fox Sports HD)
 29 November – 7TWO (Southern Cross Tasmania)
 4 December – ABC3
 23 December – 7TWO ON PRIME (Prime Television)

Defunct channels 
 15 January – Interactive Sports Selector (Channel 500 on Foxtel)
 26 March – Ten HD (replaced by ONE)
 1 June – SBS World News Channel (replaced by SBS Two)
 30 June – Gamesworld (Channel 555 on Foxtel)
 2 August – Nine HD (replaced by Nine Network HD simulcast)
 15 November – Fox Sports HD (replaced with Fox Sports 1 HD, Fox Sports 2 HD and Fox Sports 3 HD)
 15 November – BBC HD (replaced with UKTV HD)
 15 November – Showtime Greats (replaced with Showtime Drama, Showtime Comedy and Showtime Action)

Renamed channels 
 15 November – showtime premiere (formerly Showtime)
 15 November – [V] Hits (formerly Channel [V])

Ratings

Premieres

Domestic series

International series

Telemovies

Miniseries

Documentary specials

Specials

Programming changes

Changes to network affiliation 
This is a list of programs which made their premiere on an Australian television network that had previously premiered on another Australian television network. The networks involved in the switch of allegiances are predominantly both free-to-air networks or both subscription television networks. Programs that have their free-to-air/subscription television premiere, after previously premiering on the opposite platform (free-to air to subscription/subscription to free-to air) are not included. In some cases, programs may still air on the original television network. This occurs predominantly with programs shared between subscription television networks.

Domestic

International

Free-to-air premieres 
Below is a list programs which made their premiere on free-to-air television that had previously premiered on Australian Pay TV, a program may still air on the original network.

Subscription television premieres 
This is a list programs which had their premiere on Australian subscription television that had previously premiered on free-to-air television. Programs may still air on the original network.

Domestic

International

Ending this year

Returning this year

See also 
 2009 in Australia
 List of Australian films of 2009

Notes 

References

Notes